Dylan Molloy (born August 18, 1995) is an American lacrosse player who currently plays for Chrome Lacrosse Club in the Premier Lacrosse League and the Colorado Mammoth in the National Lacrosse League. He was a three-time All-American NCAA lacrosse player at Brown University from 2014–17 who led his team to two straight NCAA tournaments.

Early and personal life 
The son of Lynn and Don, Molloy is a native of Setauket, New York, and attended St. Anthony's High School, where he earned two varsity letters in lacrosse and one each in cross country and winter track. He served as a captain of the lacrosse team his senior year and was named team MVP. He currently works for Chubb Insurance.

Career Highlights

During Molloy's four years at Brown, the team compiled a record of 45 wins and 16 losses, with the 2016 squad compiling a 13 and 1 record. The 2016 team went 14 and 2 during the regular season and received a number five seeding in the NCAA tournament before losing to eventual champion Maryland in the semifinals, in overtime. Brown made the NCAA tournament two straight years during Molloy's tenure, with a tournament record of two wins and two losses.

Molloy holds the 9th highest total in NCAA Division I with 318 career points.

Molloy was selected first overall in the 2017 MLL Draft by the Florida Launch.

After being a part of the initial group of players to form the Premier Lacrosse League, being assigned to the Redwoods Lacrosse Club, Molloy reversed his decision and returned to MLL with the New York Lizards.

Molloy was drafted 43rd overall in the 2017 NLL Draft by the Buffalo Bandits.

Statistics

MLL

NLL

PLL

Brown University

(a) 6th all-time in NCAA single-season points
(b) 4th in career goals
(c) 9th in career points

See also
2016 NCAA Division I Men's Lacrosse Championship
Brown Bears men's lacrosse
NCAA Men's Division I Lacrosse Records

References

American lacrosse players
Brown Bears men's lacrosse players
Living people
1995 births
Lacrosse forwards
Sportspeople from Suffolk County, New York
People from Setauket, New York
Lacrosse players from New York (state)
Florida Launch players
New York Lizards players
Colorado Mammoth players
Premier Lacrosse League players